Sergey Orin (born 17 August 1978) is a Tajikistani diver. He competed in the men's 3 metre springboard event at the 1996 Summer Olympics.

References

External links

1978 births
Living people
Tajikistani male divers
Olympic divers of Tajikistan
Divers at the 1996 Summer Olympics
Place of birth missing (living people)